Outstanding Animated Series may refer to the following award categories:

Annie Awards
 Annie Award for Best Animated Television Production
 Annie Award for Best Animated Television Production for Children
 Annie Award for Best Animated Television Production for Preschool
 Annie Award for Best General Audience Animated Television Production

Emmy Awards
 Children's and Family Emmy Award for Outstanding Animated Series
 Daytime Emmy Award for Outstanding Children's Animated Program, awarded from 1985 to 2021
 Daytime Emmy Award for Outstanding Pre-School Children's Animated Program, awarded from 2013 to 2021
 Primetime Emmy Award for Outstanding Animated Program

Other awards
 Saturn Award for Best Animated Series on Television
 Writers Guild of America Award for Television: Animation

See also
 List of animation awards

Animation awards